In geometry, this polyhedron can be seen as either a polyhedral stellation or a compound.

As a compound 

It can be seen as the compound of an icosahedron and dodecahedron. It is one of four compounds constructed from a Platonic solid or Kepler-Poinsot solid, and its dual.

It has icosahedral symmetry (Ih) and the same vertex arrangement as a rhombic triacontahedron.

This can be seen as the three-dimensional equivalent of the compound of two pentagons ({10/2} "decagram"); this series continues into the fourth dimension as the compound of 120-cell and 600-cell and into higher dimensions as compounds of hyperbolic tilings.

As a stellation 

This polyhedron is the first stellation of the icosidodecahedron, and given as Wenninger model index 47.

The stellation facets for construction are:

In popular culture 
In the film Tron (1982), the character Bit took this shape when not speaking.

In the cartoon series Steven Universe (2013-2019), Steven's shield bubble, briefly used in the episode Change Your Mind, had this shape.

See also 
 Compound of two tetrahedra
 Compound of cube and octahedron
 Compound of small stellated dodecahedron and great dodecahedron
 Compound of great stellated dodecahedron and great icosahedron

References

External links

Polyhedral stellation
Polyhedral compounds